Kim Hyon-ung (born 16 January 1975) is a North Korean sport shooter who competed in the 2004 Summer Olympics.

References

1975 births
Living people
North Korean male sport shooters
ISSF pistol shooters
Olympic shooters of North Korea
Shooters at the 2004 Summer Olympics
Shooters at the 1998 Asian Games
Shooters at the 2002 Asian Games
Shooters at the 2006 Asian Games
Asian Games medalists in shooting
Asian Games gold medalists for North Korea
Asian Games silver medalists for North Korea
Asian Games bronze medalists for North Korea
Medalists at the 1998 Asian Games
Medalists at the 2002 Asian Games
Medalists at the 2006 Asian Games
21st-century North Korean people